Siru (also Romanized as Sīrū) is a village in Kahak Rural District, Kahak District, Qom County, Qom Province, Iran. At the 2006 census, its population was 837, in 247 families.

References 

Populated places in Qom Province